Joanna "Asia" Dusik (born 29 May 1989, Oświęcim, Poland) is a Polish former pair skater who skated with Patryk Szałaśny. She competed from 1994 to 2007. After ending her competitive career, she became a coach of figure skating.

Competitive highlights
2004 - Polish Nationals - 1st (J)
2004 - Harghita Cup - 7th
2004 - Budapest JGP - 8th
2003 - Polish Nationals - 1st (J)
2003 - Junior Worlds - 17th
2003 - Warsaw Cup - 1st (J)
2003 - Gdansk Cup - 10th

Coaching Experience
April 2006 - May 2008
Coach Assistant of figure skating at Club of figure skating "Unia Oswiecim” in Oswiecim.

January 2009 - March 2009
Coach of Figure skating at “OSiR Zawiercie” in Zawiercie.

March 2009 - April 2009
Coach of figure skating at  Club of figure skating "Oslo Idrettslag" in Oslo Norway.   

Juny 2009
Coach on summer camp at Club of figure skating "Uppsala Skridskoklubb" in Rimbo Sweden.

August 2009 - September 2009
Coach of figure skating at Club of figure skating "RaiTa" in Raisio Finland.

August 2008 -
Coach of figure skating at Club of figure skating “Lajkonik” in Krakow.

External links
 

1989 births
Living people
Polish female pair skaters
People from Oświęcim
Sportspeople from Lesser Poland Voivodeship